Caesarius of Heisterbach (ca. 1180 – ca. 1240), sometimes erroneously called, in English, Caesar of Heisterbach, was the prior of a Cistercian monastery, Heisterbach Abbey, which was located in the Siebengebirge, near the small town of Oberdollendorf, Germany.

Caesarius of Heisterbach is remembered for a paradoxical maxim concerning the rise and decline of monasteries according to which discipline causes prosperity in a monastery, and prosperity undermines discipline.  He also gave the name of Titivillus as the demon who caused typographical errors in the work of scribes.  He is further known as having attributed to Arnaud Amalric, a leader in the Albigensian Crusade, a famous declaration.  Upon being asked how to distinguish Cathars from Catholics at the besieged town of Béziers, Arnaud supposedly replied "Caedite eos. Novit enim Dominus qui sunt eius", which translates as: "Slay them all, God will recognize his own."  This statement is often cited as "Kill them all and let God sort them out."

Heisterbach Abbey was dissolved in 1803, and the library and archives were given to the city of Düsseldorf.  The monastery and the church were sold and demolished in 1809, only the ruined apse with fragments of the choir remaining.  In 1897 a monument was erected nearby in honour of Caesarius.

Writings

As an author, Caesarius of Heisterbach is best known as the compiler of a book of hagiography, the Dialogus miraculorum (ca. 1219-1223), a collection of 746 miracle stories arranged according to twelve distinctions.  The tales are told in the form of dialogues between a monk and a novice. The work was often referred to by preachers seeking material for sermons in the Late Middle Ages. It was extremely popular and was widely distributed, and its popularity was rivaled only, perhaps, by the Golden Legend of Jacobus de Voragine.  A vision reported in the book provided the source for the iconography of the Virgin of Mercy.

The contemplative writings of Caesarius can be seen as opposing the mendicant orders of his lifetime.

The first writings of Caesarius were sermons, which he wrote for his own use.  But it was not long before his fellow monks approached him with requests for elaboration and explanation.  His ninth book was written because his fellow monks asked him for a simple and clearly understandable explanation of the Maria sequence "Ave preclara maris stella".  His other writings were responses to requests. 

Caesarius often complained that his works were taken out of his hand, unfinished and uncorrected. They were extremely well-known and popular, and some sixty known transcriptions of the  Dialogus miraculorum  preceded the publication of a critical edition.

In his sermons Caesarius treats passages from the Bible, often examining psalms or parts of them. He also relates the movements of heavenly bodies to the destinies of men.  His homilies, on the other hand, deal with the evangelical texts of the Sundays and festivals throughout the entire Church year, and are to be regarded as theological tracts and meditations rather than sermons and speeches.  They are directed not to laymen, but to monks and novices of the Cistercian Order.  The interpretations often deal with the lives of monks.
 
The writings of Caesarius are of considerable importance for the study of medieval homiletics.

External links

Catholic Encyclopedia: Caesarius of Heisterbach
Medieval Sourcebook: Caesarius of Heisterbach, from Dialogus, book V: on medieval heresies
Dialogus Miraculorum, volume 1, images from an 1851 edition (Latin)
The Dialogue On Miracles Translated by H. von E. Scott and C.C. Swinton Bland, with an introduction by G.G. Coulton. (English) 
The Art of Cistercian Persuasion in the Middle Ages and Beyond: Caesarius of Heisterbach’s “Dialogue on Miracles” and Its Reception

References 

German Cistercians
Christian hagiographers
13th-century German writers
1180s births
1240 deaths
German male writers
13th-century Latin writers